In mathematics, in the area of abstract algebra known as group theory, an A-group is a type of group that is similar to abelian groups.  The groups were first studied in the 1940s by Philip Hall, and are still studied today.  A great deal is known about their structure.

Definition
An A-group is a finite group with the property that all of its Sylow subgroups are abelian.

History

Properties
The following can be said about A-groups:
 Every subgroup, quotient group, and direct product of A-groups are A-groups.
 Every finite abelian group is an A-group.
 A finite nilpotent group is an A-group if and only if it is abelian.
 The symmetric group on three points is an A-group that is not abelian.
 Every group of cube-free order is an A-group. 
 The lower nilpotent series coincides with the derived series .
 A soluble A-group has a unique maximal abelian normal subgroup .
 Like Z-groups, whose Sylow subgroups are cyclic, A-groups can be easier to study than general finite groups because of the restrictions on the local structure. For instance, a more precise enumeration of soluble A-groups was found after an enumeration of soluble groups with fixed, but arbitrary Sylow subgroups .

References

, especially Kap. VI, §14, p751–760

Properties of groups
Finite groups